Asimakaniseekan Askiy 102A is an Indian reserve of the Muskeg Lake Cree Nation in Saskatchewan. An urban reserve, it is located in the city of Saskatoon.

References

Urban Indian reserves in Canada
Indian reserves in Saskatchewan
Division No. 16, Saskatchewan